Auguste Vos (born 3 February 1902, date of death unknown) was a Belgian athlete. He competed in the men's shot put at the 1928 Summer Olympics.

References

1902 births
Year of death missing
Athletes (track and field) at the 1928 Summer Olympics
Belgian male shot putters
Olympic athletes of Belgium
Place of birth missing